EX-3 was a Spanish mákina group composed of David Amo, Alex Castellano, and Julio Navas. They are known for being one of the most representative groups of the 90's Spanish "Mákina" phenomenon, at the time when this genre crossed over from dance clubs to the pop music arena. Popular songs by EX-3 include "Ex-P-Cial", "Extres", and "Extres-A-2".

Musical career
The group experienced success throughout Spain from 1995 to 1997, when many of their singles reached the top 10 on the Spanish Singles Chart.

Discography

Singles

References

Spanish DJs
Musical groups established in 1995
Spanish dance music groups
Spanish electronic music groups
Spanish Eurodance groups
Electronic dance music DJs